Walter Charles Post (July 9, 1929 – January 6, 1982) was a right fielder in Major League Baseball. From 1949 through 1964, Post played for the Cincinnati Reds & Redlegs (1949, 1951–57, 1960–63), Philadelphia Phillies (1958–60), Minnesota Twins (1963) and Cleveland Indians (1964).

In a 15-season career, Post was a .266 hitter with 210 home runs and 699 RBI in 1,204 games.

Career
Post is a native of Wendelin, Ohio, and played baseball for St. Henry High School. He spent most of his career with Cincinnati teams. A powerful slugger in the mid-1950s, he also was respected for his strong and accurate throwing arm.

In , Post and six of his Redleg teammates—Ed Bailey, Johnny Temple, Roy McMillan, Don Hoak, Gus Bell and Frank Robinson—were "voted" starters on the National League All-Star team, the result of a ballot stuffing campaign by Redlegs fans. Major League Baseball Commissioner Ford Frick intervened, removing Bell and Post from the starting lineup and replacing them with Hank Aaron and Willie Mays. Frick allowed Bell to remain on the team as a reserve, while Post was injured and would have been unable to play in any event.

On April 14, 1961, Post hit one of the longest recorded home runs in baseball history at Busch Stadium in St. Louis. The mammoth blast was estimated at 569 ft.   Post is also noted as the man who ended Aaron's record-setting stint on the 1950s Home Run Derby show.  Post also hit the first home run at Dodger Stadium in Los Angeles on April 10, 1962.

After playing for the Phillies, Twins, Indians, and in a second stint with the Reds, Post retired in 1963. He was inducted into the Cincinnati Reds Hall of Fame in 1965. Following his baseball career, Post worked in management at his father-in-law's business, the Minster Canning Company of Minster, Ohio.

Post died in St. Henry, Ohio in 1982. He had been undergoing treatments for cancer. He was married to Patricia (Beckman) and they had four children together: Sue, John, Mary, and Cynthia.  Post has 13 grandchildren and nine great-grandchildren. One of his grandchildren is former Ohio State and NFL quarterback Bobby Hoying.

References

External links

Wally Post at SABR (Baseball BioProject)

1929 births
1982 deaths
Baseball players from Ohio
Buffalo Bisons (minor league) players
Charleston Senators players
Cincinnati Redlegs players
Cincinnati Reds players
Cleveland Indians players
Columbia Reds players
Deaths from cancer in Ohio
Indianapolis Indians players
Major League Baseball right fielders
Middletown Rockets players
Milwaukee Brewers (minor league) players
Minnesota Twins players
Muncie Reds players
People from Mercer County, Ohio
People from St. Henry, Ohio
Philadelphia Phillies players
Syracuse Chiefs players
Tulsa Oilers (baseball) players